Tramway line T13 Express (known as the Tangentielle Ouest and Tram Express Ouest during the planning phase) is a suburban tram-train line in France which opened on 6 July 2022.

Route
It has interchanges with existing SNCF Transilien lines L, N and U, and Réseau Express Régional (RER) lines A and C.

Project
The line replaced a former branch of L line between Saint-Germain-en-Laye Grande-Ceinture and Noisy-le-Roi, going further north to Saint Germain-en-Laye RER and further south to Saint-Cyr.

Alstom Citadis Dualis tram-trains are used on the line.

See also
Grande Ceinture line
Chemin de fer de Petite Ceinture
Grande ceinture Ouest

References

External links
 Official website

Railway lines opened in 2022
Rail transport in Paris
Line 13
2022 establishments in France